The 1770s BC was a decade lasting from January 1, 1779 BC to December 31, 1770 BC.

Events and trends
 Investiture of Zimri-Lim, a painting of Zimri-Lim receiving the ring and staff from the goddess Ishtar, is made at the Royal Palace of Mari, Court 106, from around 1775 BC to 1760 BC. It is now at the Louvre, Paris.
 Babylon becomes the largest city in the world, taking the lead from Thebes, Egypt.

Significant people
 Rim-Sin I, ruler of the Middle Eastern city-state of Larsa since 1822 BC, according to the middle chronology
 Hammurabi, king of Babylon since 1792 BC, according to the middle chronology
 Shibtu, queen of Zimri-Lim from c. 1775 to 1761 BC
 Zimri-Lim, co-ruler of the city-state of Mari with Shibtu
 Yarim-Lim I, second king of the Amorite kingdom of Yamhad from c. 1780 to 1764 BC

References

18th century BC